Sun Fengwu (born 19 March 1962 in Chuzhou District, Huai'an, Jiangsu) is a Chinese basketball coach and former Olympic player who competed in the 1984 Summer Olympics, the 1988 Summer Olympics, and the 1992 Summer Olympics.

After retired as a player in 1992, Sun left China and went to Singapore, and became the head coach of the Singapore national basketball team. Later he returned to China and coached the China women's national basketball team in 2012 Summer Olympics in London, where they finished 6th.

He is now the head coach of the Chinese Basketball Association team Foshan Dralions.

References 

1962 births
Living people
Chinese men's basketball players
1982 FIBA World Championship players
1990 FIBA World Championship players
Olympic basketball players of China
Basketball players at the 1984 Summer Olympics
Basketball players at the 1988 Summer Olympics
Basketball players at the 1992 Summer Olympics
Basketball players from Jiangsu
Sportspeople from Huai'an
Asian Games medalists in basketball
Basketball players at the 1982 Asian Games
Basketball players at the 1986 Asian Games
Basketball players at the 1990 Asian Games
Asian Games gold medalists for South Korea
Asian Games silver medalists for South Korea
Medalists at the 1982 Asian Games
Medalists at the 1986 Asian Games
Medalists at the 1990 Asian Games